God's Pocket is a 2014 American drama film directed by John Slattery, his feature film directorial debut. Slattery co-wrote the screenplay with Alex Metcalf, based on the 1983 novel of the same name by Pete Dexter. The film stars Philip Seymour Hoffman, John Turturro, Christina Hendricks, and Richard Jenkins. The film premiered at the 2014 Sundance Film Festival to mixed critical reviews, and was picked up for domestic distribution by IFC Films.  The film is set in a poor working class South Philadelphia neighborhood modeled on Devil's Pocket, but filmed in Yonkers and New Jersey.

Hoffman died within two weeks of the film's premiere at Sundance's 2014 U.S. Dramatic Competition.

Plot
When a blue collar worker's stepson is killed in a mysterious accident, he tries to cope, but things become difficult as the characters continue to intertwine in unexpected ways.

Cast 
 Philip Seymour Hoffman as Mickey Scarpato
 Richard Jenkins as Richard Shellburn
 Christina Hendricks as Jeanie Scarpato
 John Turturro as Arthur "Bird" Capezio
 Eddie Marsan as "Smilin' Jack" Moran
 Peter Gerety as McKenna
 Caleb Landry Jones as Leon Hubbard
 Domenick Lombardozzi as Sal Cappi
 Joyce Van Patten as Aunt Sophie
 Molly Price as Joanie
 Bridget Barkan
 Lenny Venito
 Glenn Fleshler as Coleman Peets
 Matthew Lawler
 Danny Mastrogiorgio
 Eddie McGee as Petey Kearns

Reception
God's Pocket received mixed reviews from critics. On Rotten Tomatoes, the film has a rating of 37% based on 98 reviews, with an average score of 5.45/10. The website's critical consensus reads: "Well-cast but frustratingly clichéd, God's Pocket fails to strike a sensible balance between comedy and drama." On Metacritic, the film received a score of 51 out of 100, based on 27 critics, indicating "mixed or average reviews".

The Hollywood Reporter called it a "half-good effort" that lacked the "snap, precision and stylistic smarts a mixed-tone project like this requires." Screen International called it "too shaggy and tonally inconsistent to hold together."   Stephanie Merry from the Washington Post said, "What began as an intriguing snapshot begins to feel grotesque and inscrutable."

The film received some positive reviews from notable critics. Richard Roeper said, "John Slattery's direction is skilled and steady... Great actors at the top of their game working with rich material." David Edelstein of New York Magazine/Vulture said, "Slattery adapted the book with Alex Metcalf and gets the tone just right.  The film is damnably amusing."  In a Sundance first-look review The Guardian gave the film 4 out of 5 stars. The New York Post said the film was "crafted with great skill".

Release
IFC Films gave the film a limited release on May 9, 2014. Domestically, the film's widest release was in 80 theaters, generating only $170,000 in box office.

Arrow Films acquired the UK rights and Electric Entertainment handled the international rights.

References

External links
 

2014 drama films
Films based on American novels
Economics films
Films set in Philadelphia
2010s business films
Films shot in Philadelphia
Films shot in New Jersey
American business films
American drama films
2014 directorial debut films
2010s English-language films
2010s American films